Milsons Point is a suburb on the lower North Shore of Sydney, in the state of New South Wales, Australia. The suburb is located 3 kilometres north of the Sydney central business district in the local government area of North Sydney Council.

Milsons Point is also the geographical feature that juts into Sydney Harbour from the northern side, directly opposite Sydney Cove, the spot where the first European settlement was established in 1788.

Milsons Point was named after James Milson (1783–1872), one of the earliest settlers.

History

Milsons Point was named after James Milson (1783–1872), a free settler originally from Lincolnshire. Milson settled in the area near Milsons Point and established a profitable business supplying ships with stone ballast, fresh water, and the produce of his dairy, orchard, and vegetable gardens. In the early 1820s Milson settled in the vicinity of Jeffrey Street, Kirribilli, on 120 acres of land he leased from Robert Campbell (1769–1846). In 1824 Milson received a 50-acre grant of his own adjoining Campbell's land (which is marked on the 1840s map above). In 1826 a bushfire raged through the area destroying Milson's home, orchard and dairy and farm which he subsequently rebuilt (refer to 1840s map). In 1831 Campbell was involved with Milson in a court action over Milson's non-payment of the lease of the 120 acres. Milson lived in the vicinity of Jeffrey Street until 1831 when he built a new home, "Brisbane House", on his 50 acres facing Lavender Bay. The next home he built, also on his 50 acres, was called "Grantham". By the 1840s Milson was leasing only the portion Campbell's 120 acres that contained Milson's orchard in the vicinity of Jeffrey Street. In 1872 Milson died at home at "Gratham" in the modern suburb of Milsons Point in what was then called the Municipality of East St Leonards.

The last of the family's holdings in the lower North Shore area were resumed in the early 1920s for the construction of the Harbour Bridge and associated roadways.

Heritage listings 
Milsons Point has a number of heritage-listed sites, including:
 North Shore railway: Milsons Point railway station
 1 Olympic Drive: Luna Park Sydney
 Bradfield Highway and North Shore railway: Sydney Harbour Bridge

Population
In the 2016 Census, there were 2,158 people in Milsons Point (State Suburbs). 40.4% of people were born in Australia. The next most common countries of birth were England 7.0% and China 5.7%. 56.0% of people only spoke English at home. Other languages spoken at home included Mandarin 8.0% and Cantonese 7.6%. The most common responses for religion were No Religion 34.4% and Catholic 19.0%.

Transport
Milsons Point supports the northern end of the Sydney Harbour Bridge. Milsons Point is well connected with the CBD of Sydney by the bridge, ferries and trains. The Warringah Freeway provides a link south to the Sydney CBD and north to Chatswood.

Milsons Point railway station is on the northern approach to the Sydney Harbour Bridge. The Milsons Point ferry wharf, serviced by the Balmain, Pyrmont Bay and Rydalmere ferry lines, is located to the west of the bridge in the south-west part of the suburb. In addition to rail services, Milson's Point is serviced by buses that run to the Lower North Shore and Northern Beaches.  School Buses leave from Bradfield Park to transport students to schools in North Sydney.

Commercial area
Milsons Point has a mixture of residential and commercial development.

Notable residents
 Michael Stutchbury

Sport and recreation
Milsons Point has the entertainment centre Luna Park and the North Sydney Olympic Pool.

Schools
Schools in the area include the Catholic schools Loreto Kirribilli for girls and St Aloysius' College for boys.

Churches
 Chinese Christian Church

Podcasts

Spokey Blokeys ride around Milsons point in their 90th episode

Gallery

References

External links

  [CC-By-SA]

Suburbs of Sydney